Wolfgang "Wolf" Helmut Berger (5 October 1937, Erlangen – 6 August 2017 San Diego, California) was a German-American oceanographer, geologist, micropaleontologist and emeritus professor at the Scripps Institution of Oceanography, University of California, San Diego. His research interests comprise "micropaleontology, marine sedimentation, ocean productivity, carbon cycle, ocean history, climate history, and history of oceanography."

Education and career
Berger earned in 1961 his Vordiplom degree in geology at the University of Erlangen and in 1963 his master's degree in geology at the University of Colorado in Boulder. In 1968 he received his PhD in oceanography from the University of California, San Diego (UCSD). From 1968 to 1970 he did research at the UCSD's Scripps Institution of Oceanography, and in 1970/1971 he was an Assistant at the Geological Institute of the University of Kiel. In 1971 he became an assistant professor, in 1974 an associate professor, and then in 1981 a professor at the Scripps Institution, where he was in 1996/1997 the interim director. In 1997 Berger became the director of the California Space Institute in San Diego. In 1977 and in 1980 he was a visiting professor at the University of Kiel. In 1987 he did research at the University of Bremen.

His research was especially concerned with the ecology of planktonic foraminifera and the reconstruction of the climate and the marine environment of the Cenozoic.

Berger was a Fellow of the American Association for the Advancement of Science, the American Geophysical Union, and the Geological Society of America.

Awards and honors
1979 – Bigelow Medal, Woods Hole Oceanographic Institute
1980 – Norwegian Research Fellow
1984 – A.G. Huntsman Award for Excellence in the Marine Sciences, Bedford Institute of Oceanography
1986 – Lady Davis Fellow, Hebrew University
1986 – Humboldt Award, presented in Bonn
1988 – Maurice Ewing Medal, presented in San Francisco
1991 – Prince Albert I Medal, presented in Paris
1993 – Balzan Prize, presented in Bern
1998 – Gustav-Steinmann-Medaille, presented in Bern
2001 – Foreign Member, Academia Europaea
2012 - EGU Milutin Milankovic Medal, presented in Vienna

Selected works
 
 with L. D. Labeyrie (ed.): 
 with Eugen Seibold: The sea floor: an introduction to marine geology, Springer 1982, 3rd edition 1996

References

External links
 List of publications by Wolfgang H. Berger, ucsd.edu
 "Innovative Tools for Educators: An Interactive Online Atlas of Ocean Productivity", Wolfgang H. Berger, Director of California Space Institute

1937 births
2017 deaths
American oceanographers
German oceanographers
American paleontologists
German paleontologists
University of California, San Diego alumni
Scripps Institution of Oceanography faculty
Fellows of the American Association for the Advancement of Science
Fellows of the American Geophysical Union
Fellows of the Geological Society of America
Micropaleontologists
Gustav-Steinmann-Medaille winners
People from Erlangen